Haft Sui (also Romanized as Haft Sū’ī and Haft Sūy; also known as Afsū and Haft) is a village in Bala Velayat Rural District, Bala Velayat District, Bakharz County, Razavi Khorasan Province, Iran. At the 2006 census, its population was 288, in 61 families.

References 

Populated places in Bakharz County